On September 8, 1974, a Boeing 707-331B (registered ) operating as TWA Flight 841 from Tel Aviv to New York City via Athens and Rome crashed into the Ionian Sea, killing all aboard. The National Transportation Safety Board determined that the plane had been destroyed by a bomb hidden in the cargo hold. The detonation of the bomb destroyed the systems responsible for operating the plane's control surfaces, causing the plane to pitch up until it stalled and dove into the sea.

Background

After the ousting of the PLO from Jordan following the Jordanian-Palestinian civil war, the Palestinian military organizations made South Lebanon into their headquarters, enlisting militants from Palestinian refugee camps.  South Lebanon was also referred to as Fatahland, due to the almost complete control of Fatah and other military Palestinian organizations over this officially Lebanese area, which they used to stage attacks against Israel.

Events
The airline's Tel Aviv office said 49 passengers boarded the plane there for Rome and the United States. They included 17 Americans (plus a baby), 13 Japanese, four Italians, four French, three Indians, two Iranians, two Israelis, two Sri Lankans, an Australian and a Canadian. The nationalities of 30 other passengers and the nine crew members were not immediately known at the time. Reuters reported a total of 37 Americans aboard. The crash occurred about 50 nautical miles west of Cephalonia, Greece.

After stopping for 68 minutes in Athens, it departed for Rome. About 30 minutes after takeoff, the plane crashed into the Ionian Sea. The out-of-control aircraft was observed by crew on the flight deck of Pan Am Flight 110. They watched the aircraft execute a steep climb, followed by the separation of an engine from the wing and a death spiral. All 79 passengers and nine crew members were killed.

In Beirut, it was reported that a Palestinian youth organization claimed it had put a guerrilla on the plane with a bomb. However, a spokesman for TWA said sabotage was "highly unlikely." Later, the National Transportation Safety Board determined that the plane was indeed destroyed by a bomb hidden in the cargo hold, which caused structural failure resulting in uncontrollable flight. The USS Independence along with the USS Biddle was tasked with picking up the debris and bodies.

Suspicion fell on Abu Nidal and his terror organization.

In January 2009, the Associated Press published an investigation saying that Khalid Duhham Al-Jawary, responsible for the 1973 New York City bomb plot, was linked to the bombing of TWA Flight 841.

Maps

Notes
Barry Werth, 31 Days: Gerald Ford, The Nixon Pardon and a Government in Crisis (New York: Anchor Books). 2006. pp. 324–5

References

External links
 (Alternate link, Archive)
 Criminal Occurrence Description at the Aviation Safety Network

Airliner bombings
841
Aviation accidents and incidents in 1974
Accidents and incidents involving the Boeing 707
Aviation accidents and incidents in Greece
Palestinian terrorist incidents in Europe
Attacks on aircraft by Palestinian militant groups
1974 in the United States
1974 in Greece
Palestinian terrorist incidents in Greece
Mass murder in 1974
Suicide bombing
September 1974 events in Europe
1974 crimes in Greece
Terrorist incidents in Greece in the 1970s
Terrorist incidents in Europe in 1974